Suankularb Wittayalai School (โรงเรียนสวนกุหลาบวิทยาลัย) (also known as Suankularb College)  literally Rose Garden College is an all-boys secondary school for grades 7 through 12 in Bangkok, Thailand. Founded by King Chulalongkorn in 1882 as a peer's school, its purpose was to educate the children of nobility and the royal household. Suankularb is the oldest public secondary school in the country. Suankularb alumni include eight Prime Ministers of Thailand, nine Supreme Court Chief Justices, five attorneys general, two Fortune Global 500 chief executives, scholars, as well as a number of prominent politicians and businessmen. Suankularb is a member of Jaturamitr group of the four oldest boys' schools in Thailand.

History
"Suankularb" means 'rose garden' in Thai, as the original school was in the area of a rose garden in the Grand Palace. The school was established by King Chulalongkorn on 29 August 1882 and was originally for Royal Page Lieutenants. It has always benefited from royal patronage.

Under the patronage and guidance of King Chulalongkorn the school grew quickly, changing its focus from military training to a more broadly-based curriculum that reflected the needs of its students. The number of students rapidly swelled to many hundreds. Some were relocated to other educational institutes outside the Grand Palace area (1893) such as Sunanthalai Garden and Thepsirin Temple school, and to its present site, originally donated by Wat Lieb (or Rachaburana Temple) in 1910. The opening of the first building at this site (called the Memorial Suan Kularb Building, but known among students as "the long building" because for many years it was the longest building in the country) was presided over by King Rama V. At this event he declared the importance of education as a means of developing the country.

The school has two shrines. The first, called Luang Phor Suankularb, is a  metal Buddha donated by King Rama V. The second, in the shape of a many-armed elephant and with a water display, is called "Luang Phor Poo" and is near the main entrance. It is thought to house the protective spirit of the place (known as "Grandfather"), with students making daily offerings of flower garlands as a token of respect.

For over a century, Suankularb's alumni have played important social, political, governmental, military, and academic roles in Thailand. During its early days, English expatriates served as the board of directors, and made it possible for notable school leavers, such as MR Kukrit Pramoj, to continue their studies abroad at institutions such as Oxford University. Early alumni formed a major group of Thai scholars sent to study abroad yearly under the King's Scholarships, and later Thai government scholarships. Upon their return, they worked mostly in government agencies and academic institutions and helped in modernizing the country.

King Bhumibol Adulyadej gave Suankularb an award for being the best school in the country between 1973 and 1975. Students won first prize in the King's Scholarship and in the Mathematics Association of Thailand's quiz.

In 1981 a multi-purpose building and gymnasium known as Building Number Six was built to commemorate the school's centennial. It was opened by King Bhumibol Adulyadej on 30 July 1984. Every year on 29th August – the founding day of the school – all O.S.K ("Old Suankularb") students assemble in front of Building Six where they pay respects to the large statue of King Rama V there. An auditorium was built in 1995 and opened that year by Princess Maha Chakri Sirindhorn. The teaching of science and technology has been a central policy of the school. The school possesses an extensive library, with some rare and valuable books donated by former Prime Minister Thanin Kraivixien.

Facts
School Area: 
School Abbreviation: S.K.
Type of School: Government Boys' Secondary School (195 teachers and 3,918 students)
School Motto: (Pali) Suvijāno bhavaṃ hoti, He who knows well will progress
School Vision: "Suankularb Wittayalai School is the engine of the leadership of Thai society. We place a premium on ethics, followed by the acquisition of knowledge. Our school fosters standout pupils who keep themselves abreast of the development of science and technology to achieve an international standard. The result is exceptional members of Thai society who find personal contentment based on a deep understanding of Thai culture and the sustainability thereof."

School emblem
A book, with a ruler, pen and pencil is inserted in the book. On the cover of the book, is a royal headdress (the "Pra Kiew" symbol) and King Chulalongkorn's initials. On the right side, there is a bouquet of roses. To the left of the book, a ribbon tying the bouquet of roses with the name of the school written on it. On the top, the Buddhist philosophy and moral principle in Pali and Thai which means : "He who knows well will progress."

School colours
 Pink, the colour for Tuesday, is the day King Chulalongkorn was born.
 Blue, the colour for Friday, is the day the school was created, and the day that Queen Siphatcharindra was born.

Alumni

Statesmen of Thailand
Pridi Phanomyong or Luang Praditmanutham (Senior Statesman)
General Prem Tinsulanonda

Prime Ministers of Thailand
Phraya Manopakorn Nititada (Kon Hutasingha)
Tawee Boonyaket
Mom Rajawongse Seni Pramoj
Pridi Phanomyong or Luang Praditmanutham
Maj. Gen. Mom Rajawongse Kukrit Pramoj
Thanin Kraivichien
General Prem Tinsulanonda
General Surayud Chulanont

Supreme Commander of Royal Thai Armed Forces
General Sunthorn Kongsompong
General Mongkol Ampornpisit
General Surayud Chulanont
General Ruangroj Mahasaranon

Commander-in-Chief of Royal Thai Army
General Prem Tinsulanonda
General Surayud Chulanont

Others
Phrathepyanmahamuni
Pin Malakul
Panupong Pituksung
Phon Sangsingkeo
Somsak Jeamteerasakul (90)
Newin Chidchob (90)
Watana Muangsook (90)
Toon Bodyslam (115)
Godji Tachakorn Boonlupyanun (121)
Tay Tawan Vihokratana (128)
March Chutavuth Pattarakampol (129)
Singto Prachaya Ruangroj (130)
Gunsmile Chanagun Arpornsutinan (132)
James Teeradon Supapunpinyo (133)
Bright Vachirawit Chiva-aree (134)
Gulf Kanawut Traipipattanapong (134)
Sky Wongravee Nateetorn (134)
First Kanaphan Puitrakul (135)
Satang Kittiphop Sereevichayasawat (138)
Ford Allan Asawasuebsakul (139)
Barcode Tinnasit Isarapongporn (141)

Traditions
Suankularb Wittayalai School has many traditional events., including La-on Day, Samarnmitr Day, and Chak-Yao Day.

On La-on day all Matayom 6 students welcome first-year students to the school. It contains around six stations that were created by each group of Matayom 6 students, and each station has a souvenir to give to Matayom 1 students. At the end of the day, Matayom 6 student bands play a concert.

On Samarnmitr Day students and alumni come to Suankularb Wittayalai School. There are booths from every class, souvenirs, a soccer match, a mini concert from band, and additional activities that change from year to year. In the evening is an activity called "SK Jazz", a performance by the school orchestra and teachers.

Chak-Yao Day is the final examination day of Matayom 6 students, their last day at the school. All Matayom 6 students come and dine together  with their teachers. After the dinner each class of Matayom 6 sit together in a circle and make a short speech. At the end of the event they sing a "Chompoo-Fah ar lai" song together.

Other events include:

Rub Kwan Se-Ma day (Thai: วันรับขวัญเสมา)
Muthitachit day (Thai: วันมุทิตาจิต)
Introducing Activity day (Thai: วันแนะนำกิจกรรม)
Orientation Camp (Thai: เข้าค่ายปฐมนิเทศ)

Events
Jaturamitr Samakkee Traditional football competition (with Debsirin School, Assumption College, and Bangkok Christian College, biannually)
Suankularb Exhibition (every four years)

Student organization
Student Committee
Suankularb Wittayalai Student Committee (SKSC)

Clubs Since 2000 - 2022 :

A-Math Club
A-Math&Sudoku
Agriculture Club
Aquarium Club 
Archery Club
Art Club
Art of Speech and Presentation Association(ASPA)
Art of Writing (AOW)Club
Astronomy Club
B-Boy Club
Badminton Club
Bakery Club
Basketball Club
BB Gun Club
Board Game Club
Bodybuilding and Exercise Club
Buddhist Club
Business Club
Cheer Club
Chess Club
Chorus Club
Computer Club
Consumer's Protection Club
Crossword Club
Dance Club
Economics Club
Entertainment Club
Fast Calculator Math Club
Foreign Language Club
French Language Club
Game Card Club
Geology Olympic Club
Germany Language Club
GO Club
Hardware Club
Harmonic Club
History Club
Hobby Club
Interact Club
Japanese Language Club
Jeensik Club
Kamen Rider Club
Khonsuankularb Club
Kularb Khao Club
Lakornsuan Club
Library Club
Magic Trick Show Club
Martial arts for Healthy Club
Math Club
Math Olympic Club
Military Band Club
Model Collector Club
Movie Club
National Music Club
Photo Club
Pingpong Club
Pokémon Club
Poo Kan Ban Club
Public Relations Club
Resource Conservation Club
Robot Maker Club
Robotics Club
Rollerskate Club
School Bank Club
Science Club
Scout Club
Short  Film Club
SK Hotel Club
Sketch Club
Social Club
Social Youth Association 
Student Superintendent Club
Suan Communication Club
Suan Forum Club
Suan Health Club
Suan Rak Suan Club
Swimming Club
Taekwondo Club 
Technic Club
Technology&Development Club
Thai Boxing Club
Thai Culture Club
Thai Language Club
Thai Traditional Dance Club
Thai Traditional Music Club
Travel Club
UNESCO Club
Video games and Coding Club
Youth's Stargazer Club

References

External links
Official School Website
Unofficial School Webboard
Official alumni website
 Location and contact info

Boys' schools in Thailand
Educational institutions established in 1882
Phra Nakhon district
Schools in Bangkok
1882 establishments in Siam